Saxton Smith (October 2, 1802 – 1890) was an American politician from New York.

Life
He was the son of Abraham Smith (1763–1813) and Mary (Knapp) Smith. He was born at the house built by his grandfather, located in that part of Philipstown, New York, then in Dutchess County, which was separated in 1839 as the Town of Quincy, and renamed in 1840 as Putnam Valley, now in Putnam County.

He was Supervisor of the Town of Putnam Valley in 1841, 1842, 1850, 1851, 1858, 1860, 1862, 1863 and from 1867 to 1876.

He was a member of the New York State Assembly (Putnam Co.) in 1838, 1840 and 1844.

He was a member of the New York State Senate from 1846 to 1849, sitting in the 69th, 70th (both 2nd D.), 71st and 72nd New York State Legislatures (both 7th D.).

He was again a member of the State Assembly in 1863, and a member of the State Senate (8th D.) in 1864 and 1865.

Saxton Smith never married.

Sources
The New York Civil List compiled by Franklin Benjamin Hough (pages 135f, 145, 221, 224, 229 and 306; Weed, Parsons and Co., 1858)
The New York Civil List compiled by Franklin Benjamin Hough, Stephen C. Hutchins and Edgar Albert Werner (1867; pages 443 and 497)
His house, in Putnam County by Guy Cheli ("Images of America" series, Arcadia Publishing, 2004; pg. 101)

1802 births
1890 deaths
Democratic Party New York (state) state senators
Democratic Party members of the New York State Assembly
People from Putnam County, New York
Town supervisors in New York (state)
19th-century American politicians